Cryptoses is a genus of snout moths. It was described by Harrison Gray Dyar Jr. in 1908.

Species
 Cryptoses choloepi Dyar, 1908
 Cryptoses rufipictus Bradley, 1982
 Cryptoses waagei Bradley, 1982

References

Chrysauginae
Pyralidae genera